Staré Splavy (German Thammühl am See) is a town and a former spa resort, a part of the Doksy municipality in the Česká Lípa district, Liberec region, North Bohemia.

It is a recreation center on the northwest shore of Máchovo jezero. At the turn of the 19th and 20th centuries, it was one of the most famous holiday destinations in all of  Austro-Hungary. Even during the First Czechoslovak Republic, Staré Splavy was a popular recreational place, especially for well-off Jewish clientele from Prague, Liberec and even places as distant as Berlin or Vienna. 
At the beginning of the 20th century, many built their summer homes here, mostly in the style of art nouveau or functionalism (for example the Kohn brothers from Prague or Miloš Forman's parents).

The place was then often dubbed „das Böhmischer Lido“ („The Bohemian Lido“ in German). Because the post-war communist regime made the entire area one of the centres of socialist-style recreation in all of Czechoslovakia (especially in the 1970s and 1980s), sometimes it is today referred to as "Ibiza for the poor" ("Ibiza pro chudé"). Due to still relatively high density of Jewish families in the vicinity (who either are post-WWII natives here or moved here from Prague and other big cities since the 1990s), it is often referred to as "the Czech Catskills" or "Czech Florida".

Some well-known 20th century characters associated with the town include Franz Kafka (who has even dedicated one of his novels to the place, titled "Die Synagogue von Thammühl" - "The Synagogue of Thammühl"), Karel Poláček, Friedrich Torberg, František R. Kraus or Miloš Forman, apart of more ancient personalities, such as the Holy Roman Emperor Charles IV or a romantic Czech poet Karel Hynek Mácha, whose famous poem "Máj" is said to take place onshore of the hereby lake.

References 

Populated places in Česká Lípa District